WWE Roadblock (originally titled March to WrestleMania: Live from Toronto) was the inaugural Roadblock professional wrestling livestreaming event produced by WWE. The event aired exclusively on the WWE Network and took place on March 12, 2016, at the Ricoh Coliseum in Toronto, Ontario, Canada. The event's title was a reference to its position on the "Road to WrestleMania".

Nine matches (including two dark matches) were contested at the event. The main event saw Triple H defeat Dean Ambrose to retain the WWE World Heavyweight Championship. Other prominent matches included The New Day (Big E and Kofi Kingston) retaining the WWE Tag Team Championship against The League of Nations (Sheamus and King Barrett) in the opening bout, The Revival (Dash Wilder and Scott Dawson) retained the NXT Tag Team Championship against Enzo Amore and Colin Cassady, Brock Lesnar defeated Bray Wyatt and Luke Harper in a 2-on-1 handicap match, and Charlotte retained the WWE Divas Championship against Natalya in the last televised defense of the Divas Championship.

Production

Background
The American professional wrestling promotion WWE originally had a house show scheduled for March 12, 2016, at the Ricoh Coliseum in Toronto, Ontario, Canada, and it was titled "March to WrestleMania: Live from Toronto". To further build towards the following month's WrestleMania 32, WWE decided to broadcast the event live and exclusively on their online streaming service, the WWE Network. They also renamed the event to Roadblock, which was a reference to its position on the "Road to WrestleMania".

Storylines 
The card consisted of seven matches that resulted from scripted storylines, where wrestlers portrayed villains, heroes, or less distinguishable characters in scripted events that built tension and culminated in a wrestling match or series of matches, with results predetermined by WWE's writers. Storylines were played out on WWE's primary television programs, Raw and SmackDown, along with WWE's developmental branch NXT.

On the February 29 episode of Raw, Dean Ambrose challenged Triple H to a match for the WWE World Heavyweight Championship. Later that night, Triple H interfered in Ambrose's match against Alberto Del Rio, causing a disqualification. Ambrose attacked Triple H, but Triple H stopped his onslaught with a Pedigree. He then accepted the challenge before attacking Ambrose again. The match was scheduled for Roadblock.

On the March 2 episode of NXT, NXT Tag Team Champions The Revival were scheduled to defend their titles against Enzo Amore and Colin Cassady at Roadblock.

At the Royal Rumble, Brock Lesnar eliminated Luke Harper, Erick Rowan, and Braun Strowman of The Wyatt Family from the Royal Rumble match. However, the trio re-entered the ring and eliminated Lesnar from the match. On the March 3 episode of SmackDown, a match between Brock Lesnar and Bray Wyatt was scheduled for Roadblock.

On March 8, WWE Tag Team Champions The New Day were scheduled to defend their titles against Sheamus and King Barrett (of The League of Nations) at Roadblock.

On March 11, a non-title match between Divas Champion Charlotte and Natalya was scheduled for the event. In a pre-recorded segment aired immediately before the match, Natalya goaded Charlotte into putting her title on the line in what would be the last televised Divas Championship match.

Event

Preliminary matches
The event opened with The New Day (Big E and Kofi Kingston) defending the WWE Tag Team Championship against The League of Nations (Sheamus and King Barrett). Big E executed a Big Ending on Barrett to retain the titles.

Next, Chris Jericho faced Jack Swagger. Jericho forced Swagger to submit to the Walls of Jericho to win the match.

After that, The Revival (Scott Dawson and Dash Wilder) defended the NXT Tag Team Championship against Enzo Amore and Colin Cassady. The Revival executed the Shatter Machine on Amore to retain the titles.

In the fourth match, Charlotte defended the WWE Divas Championship against Natalya. Charlotte pinned Natalya with a roll-up using the ropes for leverage to retain the title.

The fifth match, originally pitting Brock Lesnar against Bray Wyatt, was changed into a 2-on-1 handicap match also involving Luke Harper. Wyatt remained outside the ring throughout the match. Harper executed a Big Boot, two Superkicks and a Discus Clothesline on Lesnar for a near-fall. Lesnar executed five German Suplexes and an F5 on Harper to win the match.

In the penultimate match, Sami Zayn faced Stardust. Zayn executed a Helluva Kick on Stardust to win the match.

Main event
In the main event, Triple H defended the WWE World Heavyweight Championship against Dean Ambrose. During the match, Ambrose executed Dirty Deeds on Triple H, but the referee voided the count as Ambrose's foot was underneath the bottom rope. In the climax of the match, Ambrose executed a Diving Elbow Drop on Triple H, who was standing outside the ring. Ambrose attempted an Elbow Drop off the barricade on Triple H, who was draped on the announce table, but Triple H rolled off and Ambrose fell through the announce table. Triple H then executed a Pedigree to retain the title.

Reception 
The event received mixed reviews. Jason Powell of Pro Wrestling Dot Net commented, "Overall, Roadblock is what most of us thought it would be. They weren't going to shake up the WrestleMania lineup three weeks away. I know some fans convinced themselves it was possible, but it just never struck me as being realistic regardless of whether it would have made for a better WrestleMania lineup".

James Caldwell of Pro Wrestling Torch wrote that Roadblock was a "glorified house show for the most part, but the toned-down, less-corporate production value was refreshing for a WWE broadcast". Regarding the main event, Caldwell said that the "false finish for Dean was interesting in that WWE is lacking goodwill heading into Mania and going that far with a false finish straddled the line of being more of a turn-off than heat-generator".

John Powell of Canoe.ca summed up that there were "no surprises at a solid Roadblock... Although the overall show was far better than any of the WWE's recent pay-per-views, Roadblock did nothing at all to fuel any kind of excitement for WrestleMania or its feuds". For the main event, Powell wrote, "In the match of his career, Ambrose proved beyond a shadow of a doubt he is main event material, perhaps soon to be following in the legendary but demented footsteps of another unorthodox superstar, one Mick Foley". Powell also praised Canadians "Natalya, Chris Jericho and Sami Zayn all putting in exceptional performances", as well as the four NXT wrestlers who proved "why NXT is still the show to watch each and every week". However, commentator JBL was criticized after he "literally loses his mind and starts yelling". His grade went to Triple H vs. Dean Ambrose with 8 and a half out of 10 while Brock Lesnar vs. Bray Wyatt and Luke Harper got the worst with a 5 out of 10.

Larry Csonka from 411mania.com gave the event a 7 stars out of 10 rating. The highest rated match was Ambrose vs. Triple H (4 stars), judging that the match "was a lot of fun and felt fresh, but it wasn't without its problems", while Stardust vs. Zayn was rated the lowest (1 star). Csonka also praised the NXT Tag Team Championship match (3 1/2 stars) and the WWE Tag Team Championship match (3 stars).

Aftermath
The Roadblock name would be reused for the promotion's December pay-per-view (PPV) and WWE Network event that same year. It was held exclusively for wrestlers from the Raw brand after the promotion had reintroduced the brand extension in July, again splitting its main roster into two separate brands called Raw and SmackDown where wrestlers were exclusively assigned to perform. This second event was titled Roadblock: End of the Line as it was WWE's final PPV of 2016. Roadblock was then discontinued as another event was not scheduled for 2017. However, after five years, Roadblock was revived for the NXT brand to be held as a television special titled NXT Roadblock. A second NXT Roadblock was confirmed for the following year, thus establishing Roadblock as an annual March event for NXT.

Results

References

External links 
 

WWE Roadblock
2016 WWE Network events
2016 in Toronto
Professional wrestling in Toronto
Events in Toronto
March 2016 events in Canada
WWE in Canada